The Clach a' Mheirlich (literally, the "Thief's stone") or Rosskeen Stone is a standing stone in a field near Rosskeen, Easter Ross, Scotland.

The stone itself is Bronze Age in origin, but has on it three incised Pictish-style symbols barely visible on the surface of the stone, making it a Class I Pictish symbol stone.

References
 MacNamara, Ellen, The Pictish Stones of Easter Ross, (Tain, 2003)
 Scott, Douglas, The Stones of the Pictish Peninsulas, (Hilton Trust, 2004)

See also
Celtic art

Bronze Age Scotland
Pictish stones
Pictish stones in Highland (council area)
Scheduled monuments in Scotland

fr:Pierres Pictes de Ross